William McCraney (December 15, 1831 – June 21, 1911) was a businessman and political figure in Ontario, Canada. He represented Halton in the House of Commons of Canada as a Liberal member from 1875 to 1878 and from 1882 to 1887.

Biography
He was born in Trafalgar Township, Upper Canada in 1831, the son of Hiram McCraney and Louisa English. From 1852 to 1855, he was involved in lumbering and mining in California. He owned several large farms near Oakville and several sawmills in Halton County.  McCraney helped build several Methodist churches and supported temperance.  In 1857, he married Elizabeth Coote.  In 1868, he sold his farm land and settled in Oakville.  He served on the town council, serving as mayor in 1871 and 1872, and also served on the county council. McCraney was also president of the county agricultural society. He was elected as the Member of Parliament for Halton in a by-election in 1875.  He was defeated by William McDougall for the Halton seat in 1878 and reelected in 1882.

His brother Daniel was a member of the Ontario assembly. His daughter Susan married Alexander Henderson.

Electoral record

				

	

On Daniel Black Chisholm being unseated, on petition, 8 December 1874:

See also
List of mayors of Oakville, Ontario

References

External links

 
 Drawing of McCraney residence

1831 births
1911 deaths
Liberal Party of Canada MPs
Members of the House of Commons of Canada from Ontario
Mayors of Oakville, Ontario
Canadian Methodists